Sierra Madre National Forest was established as the Sierra Madre Forest Reserve by the U.S. Forest Service in Wyoming on November 5, 1906 with .  It became a National Forest on March 4, 1907. On July 1, 1908 the entire forest was combined with Park Range National Forest to create Hayden  National Forest and the name was discontinued.

References

External links
Forest History Society
Listing of the National Forests of the United States and Their Dates (from the Forest History Society website) Text from Davis, Richard C., ed. Encyclopedia of American Forest and Conservation History. New York: Macmillan Publishing Company for the Forest History Society, 1983. Vol. II, pp. 743-788.

Former National Forests of Wyoming
1906 establishments in Wyoming
Protected areas established in 1906